Bourg-Saint-Maurice (Arpitan: Bôrg-Sant-Mori or simply Le Bôrg), popularly known as Bourg, is a commune in the Savoie department in the Auvergne-Rhône-Alpes region in Southeastern France. Located on the Italian border south of Chamonix-Mont-Blanc, it had a population of 7,252 as of 2018. It serves as a transport hub for the Paradiski ski area, with direct trains from London and Amsterdam during the winter.

History 
Bergintrum was a place on the Gallic side of the pass of the Alpes Graiae, lying on the road marked in the Antonine Itinerary between Mediolanum (modern Milan) and Vienna (modern Vienne, Isère). Jean-Baptiste Bourguignon d'Anville (Notice, etc.) placed it between Axima (modern Aime) and Alpis Graia. The distance from Bergintrum to Axima, marked viiii M. P. The Alpis Graia, is usually identified with a settlement at the watershed on the Pass of the Little Saint Bernard, which divides the waters that flow to the Isère on the French side from those that flow to the Dora Baltea on the Italian side. This is the place D'Anville calls L'Hôpital, on the authority of a manuscript map of the country. D'Anville first proposed the identification of Bergintrum with Bourg-Saint-Maurice; although he acknowledged that xii, the distance in the Table between Bergintrum and Alpis Graia, does not fit the distance between Bourg-Saint-Maurice and L'Hôpital, which is less. Modern scholarship confirms the identification. In the course of the French Revolution, Bourg-Saint-Maurice was briefly renamed Nargue-Sarde between 1794 and 1815.

Geography 

Located in the arrondissement of Albertville in the Savoie department in the Auvergne-Rhône-Alpes region, Bourg-Saint-Maurice is the last town along the Tarentaise Valley in the heart of the French Alps.

Transport 

Bourg-Saint-Maurice station is linked to the TGV network and has services direct from London (Eurostar) and Amsterdam (Thalys) in the winter. The Arc en Ciel funicular railway links the town to the Arc 1600 ski area.

Climate 
Located in the far east of France, Bourg-Saint-Maurice is right on the boundary between the warm-summer humid continental climate (Dfb) and the oceanic climate (Cfb) under the Köppen system. Winters are long, cold with at least five months of below-freezing temperatures, especially at night. Summers are usually warm and stormy.

Population

Landmarks 
Ouvrage Chatelard is a lesser work (petit ouvrage) of the Maginot Line's Alpine extension, the Alpine Line, also known as the Little Maginot Line. Begun in 1938, the ouvrage consists of one infantry block about one kilometer northeast of the town, in the village of Le Chatelard. A short gallery with cross galleries extends into the rock, with an emergency exit and ventilation shaft halfway back. The ouvrage was incomplete in 1940, under the command of Sub-Lieutenant Bochaton.

Religious sites 
The Catholic church of St Maurice is on Grande Rue in the centre of town, the Protestant church is on Avenue Maréchal Leclerc to the south.

Economy 
Bourg-Saint-Maurice provides accommodation and a transport hub for the Paradiski ski area.

Notable people 
The French ski mountaineer Bertrand Blanc was born in Bourg-Saint-Maurice on 29 October 1973. It is also the birthplace of French politician Hervé Gaymard (31 May 1960).

See also 
Communes of the Savoie department

References

External links 

Official site municipality of Bourg Saint Maurice   
Webcams from Bourg Saint Maurice Les Arcs updated daily

Ceutrones
Communes of Savoie